The 2019 UNAF U-21 Women's Tournament is the 1st edition of the UNAF U-21 Women's Tournament. The tournament was held in Algeria, from 20 to 27 December 2019. Algeria won the tournament, Morocco finished second and Tanzania third.

Participants

 (hosts)

 (invited)
 (invited)
 (withdrew)
 (withdrew)

Venues

Squads

Tournament

Standings

Matches

Notes & references

Notes

References

External links
 2019 UNAF U-21 Women's Tournament - FAF official website

2019 in African football
UNAF U-21 women's tournament
UNAF U-21 Women's Tournament